In the theory of relational databases, a Boolean conjunctive query  is a conjunctive query without distinguished predicates, i.e., a query in the form , where each  is a relation symbol and each  is a tuple of variables and constants; the number of elements in  is equal to the arity of . Such a query evaluates to either true or false depending on whether the relations in the database contain the appropriate tuples of values, i.e. the conjunction is valid according to the facts in the database.

This query evaluates to true if there exists an individual  who is a child of Mark and employed. In other words, this query expresses the question: "does Mark have an employed child?"

See also
Logical conjunction
Conjunctive query

References

 

Boolean algebra